Laldanmawia Ralte (born 19 December 1992), popularly known as Danmawia, is an Indian professional footballer who plays as a winger for Indian Super League club NorthEast United.

Club career
Born in Mizoram, Laldanmawia  Ralte "The Sialhawk Express" began his career in the Mizoram Premier League Season 1 with Dinthar where he won the Best Player of the Season award and was tied for the top goalscorer in the league's first season. While playing club football, Laldanmawia also represented the Mizoram football team in various competitions. He is an important player of the Mizoram, Santosh Trophy champion team.

In early 2016, Laldanmawia left Mizoram to play in Tamil Nadu for MSU in the Chennai Super Division. After the season, he returned to Mizoram to sign with Chenmari West in the Mizoram Premier League.

Aizawl
In December 2016 it was revealed that Laldanmawia had signed with I-League side Aizawl for the 2016–17 season. He made his professional debut for the side in the league on 13 January 2017 against Minerva Punjab. He came on as a 62nd minute substitute for Albert Zohmingmawia as Aizawl came out as 1–0 winners.

NorthEast United
On 3 September 2021, NorthEast United announced that they had completed the signing of Danmawia on a two-year deal. He made his debut for the club on 20 November against Bengaluru FC in a 4–2 loss. He scored his first goal on 13 December in a 1–5 lost against Hyderabad FC. Danmawia scored his second goal of the season on 22 January 2022 against Chennaiyin. By the end of the  season Danmawia made thirteen appearance for Highlanders and scored four goals.

International career
In June 2018, he was called up to the national team for the Intercontinental Cup, where he made his debut in the final against Kenya in a 2–0 win for his team.

Career statistics

Club

Honours

Club
Aizawl FC
I-League(1): 2016–17
Dinthar FC
Mizoram Premier League:  2012-13

Village
Durtlang
Red-Ribbon Inter Village Football Tournament: 2011, Winner
Chanmari
Red-Ribbon Inter Village Football Tournament: 2012, Winner
Ramhlun South
NECS CUP: 2013 , Winner

Individual
Best Player Mizoram Premier League:  2012-13

References

1992 births
Living people
People from Mizoram
Indian footballers
Aizawl FC players
Association football midfielders
Footballers from Mizoram
Mizoram Premier League players
I-League players
India international footballers
East Bengal Club players
Hyderabad FC players
NorthEast United FC players
Indian Super League players